Oulun Luistinseura (or OLS) is a Finnish multi-sports club, based in Oulu. The club has football, bandy, bowling and floorball sections.

Football

OLS football team was founded in 1941 by clubs bandy players. Throughout the years the club has played mostly in lower divisions, never competing in the highest tier of Finnish football except as a part of short lived merger with OTP called FC Oulu in the early 1990s. The most successful part of OLS is the youth academy which has produced many national team level players.
Men's football team earned promotion to Kakkonen (the third tier of Finnish football) for 2014 season.

Current squad

Bandy

OLS is one of the most successful clubs in Finland and is the only non-Swedish or Russian/Soviet club to have won the Bandy World Cup, having won the title in 1976. In 1977 and 1990 they were European Cup runners-up.

OLS have won the Bandyliiga play-off to become Finnish champions 16 times the first was in 1970 and the most recent title was in 2014. OLS has won the Finnish championship in the following years: 1970, 1975, 1976, 1977, 1979, 1982, 1983, 1984, 1986, 1990, 1991, 2001, 2003, 2008, 2009, and 2014.

References

External links
 Official website

Bandy clubs in Finland
Football clubs in Finland
Association football clubs established in 1880
Bandy clubs established in 1880
Association football clubs established in 1908
Bandy clubs established in 1908
Finnish floorball teams
Sport in Oulu
1880 establishments in the Russian Empire